The 2007 European Sevens Championship was a rugby sevens competition, with the final held in Moscow, Russia. It was the sixth edition of the European Sevens championship. The event was organised by rugby's European governing body, the FIRA – Association of European Rugby (FIRA-AER).

Final standings

References

2007
International rugby union competitions hosted by Russia
European
2007–08 in European rugby union
2007 in Russian rugby union